Cameron Keith Maybin (born April 4, 1987) is an American former professional baseball outfielder and current broadcaster. He played in Major League Baseball (MLB) for the Detroit Tigers, Florida / Miami Marlins, San Diego Padres, Atlanta Braves, Los Angeles Angels, Houston Astros, Seattle Mariners, New York Yankees, Chicago Cubs and New York Mets. He was the tenth overall pick in the 2005 MLB draft by the Tigers and debuted with them in 2007. With the Astros, he won the 2017 World Series.

Early career
Maybin played high school baseball for T. C. Roberson High School in Asheville, North Carolina. As a freshman, he led his team to a state title and was named the tournament's most valuable player. Joe Hayden, his manager with the Midland Redskins, said he had "the same instincts in the outfield and at the plate" as Ken Griffey Jr., who Hayden also coached in the Connie Mack Division, an amateur baseball league for players 18 and younger. The summer before his senior season, Maybin won the Connie Mack batting title and the 2004 Connie Mack World Series MVP award. Maybin was also named the 2004 Baseball America Youth Player of the Year.

Professional career

Detroit Tigers
Prior to the 2005 MLB draft, Baseball America tabbed Maybin as the most promising available outfielder and the third-best hitting prospect overall. He fell to the Tigers in tenth spot in the 2005 draft in part due to speculation he would be difficult to sign. He signed in September for a $2.65 million bonus.

2006 
In 2006, Maybin played his first professional season for the Class-A West Michigan Whitecaps, helping them win the Midwest League championship. He had a batting average of .304, hit nine home runs and stole 27 bases. He was chosen to participate in the All-Star Futures Game.

In late November 2006, Cameron was given the Class A Playoff Performer Award by MiLB.com. He began the 2007 season with the Lakeland Flying Tigers of the High-A Florida State League. On August 9, 2007, Maybin was promoted from the Single-A Lakeland Flying Tigers to the Double-A Erie SeaWolves where he played six games before his call up to the Major League.

Maybin was consistently ranked as the Tigers top minor league prospect while in the organization.

Maybin also played in the minors in 2008 for the Marlins Double-A affiliate Carolina Mudcats where he hit .277 with 13 home runs, 49 RBIs and 21 stolen bases to go along with a hefty 124 strikeouts in 390 at-bats (108 games).

Minor league honors

2× All-Star Futures Game selection
Southern League Player of the Week
Arizona Fall League Rising Stars
Southern League Mid-Season All-Star
Baseball America High Class A All-Star
Florida State League Postseason All-Star
Florida State League Mid-Season All-Star
MiLB.com Class A Best Playoff Performer
Baseball America Low Class A All-Star
Midwest League Postseason All-Star
Midwest League Prospect of the Year

2007 
Maybin was called up to the Tigers on August 17, 2007, and made his Major League debut that day, going 0-for-4. He was the youngest player in the American League (20 years old). In his second game, August 18, 2007, Maybin picked up his first career hit, (a single), and first career home run, both off of Roger Clemens. During his next plate appearance, he was hit by a Clemens fastball. Thus, Maybin received his first Major League hit, home run and hit-by-pitch in the same game.

Florida Marlins

On December 5, 2007, the Tigers traded Maybin, Andrew Miller, Mike Rabelo, Dallas Trahern, Eulogio De La Cruz, and Burke Badenhop to the Florida Marlins for Dontrelle Willis and Miguel Cabrera.

On September 16, 2008, Maybin was called up to the Florida Marlins. He went 16 for 32 (.500 average) with 4 stolen bases in 8 Major League games.  On September 28, 2008, playing in center field, he caught the final out in the final game played at Shea Stadium – a fly ball from New York Mets right fielder Ryan Church. In 2009, Maybin was the starting center fielder for the Florida Marlins when they faced the Washington Nationals on Opening Day.  Maybin was sent down to the AAA New Orleans Zephyrs on May 10 after a poor start to the 2009 season, hitting .202 in 22 starts.  Maybin was called back up to the Marlins on August 31 after hitting .319 in Triple-A and finished out the season with the big league club.

Maybin began the 2010 season as the Marlins starting center fielder, but was sent to Triple-A New Orleans on June 17 after hitting .225 with the club. He hit .340 in the minors and rejoined the Marlins on August 24.  In his final season with the Marlins, Maybin finished the year hitting .234 with 9 stolen bases over 82 total games.

San Diego Padres (2011–2014)

Following the 2010 season, Maybin was traded to the Padres for Ryan Webb and Edward Mujica. In 2011, he became the ninth player in Padres history to steal 40 bases. He hit .264 with nine home runs and 40 RBIs and was the Padres' 2011 nominee for the Hank Aaron Award. The San Diego Union-Tribune praised Maybin's defense and called his acquisition "one of the best trades in Padres history" and named him the team's MVP. MLB.com wrote that his defense in center field was "Gold Glove-caliber".

On March 3, 2012, Maybin and the Padres agreed on a five-year contract worth $25 million with a club option for a sixth year.

Maybin began the 2012 season in a prolonged slump, hitting .212 in the first half of the season, but he rebounded in the second half, batting .283, and finished the year with a .243/.306/.349 batting line and 26 stolen bases.  He removed a high leg kick from his swing in July and credited the adjustment with his improved results. Maybin was also hampered during the season by a lingering sore wrist that caused him to miss a handful of starts in late May and in July and a sore Achilles' tendon that cost him time in September. Maybin made 136 starts in center field on the year.

Maybin missed most of the 2013 season to injuries. He started 10 games in center field before going on the disabled list in mid-April with inflammation and an impingement in his right wrist.  He returned for 4 games in early June before he tore a posterior cruciate ligament in his right knee diving for a ball. While rehabbing the knee, Maybin decided to have surgery on the wrist in September as it continued to trouble him. The surgery found loose particles and loose cartilage and a recovery time of 8–12 weeks was expected.

On July 23, 2014, Maybin was suspended 25 games for using amphetamines, a violation of the Major League Baseball drug policy. He said the failed test was the result of treatment for attention deficit disorder (ADD), but added: "I understand that I must accept responsibility for this mistake". Maybin was activated from the restricted list on August 20, 2014.

Atlanta Braves (2015)

On April 5, 2015, Maybin was traded along with LF Carlos Quentin, LF Jordan Paroubeck, RHP Matt Wisler, and a draft pick to the Atlanta Braves for RHP Craig Kimbrel and outfielder Melvin Upton Jr. During the 2015 season, Maybin hit .267/.327/.370 with 65 runs scored, 18 doubles, two triples, 10 home runs, and 59 RBIs in 141 games. He finished 10th in the National League with 23 stolen bases. He was sixth in the league with a .356 batting average with runners in scoring position.

Second stint with Detroit (2016) 

On November 20, 2015, the Braves traded Maybin to the Tigers in exchange for Ian Krol and Gabe Speier. On March 3, 2016, the Tigers announced that Maybin suffered a non-displaced fracture in his wrist that would sideline him for at least 4–6 weeks. The fracture occurred when Maybin was hit by a 95-mph fastball from New York Yankees pitcher Luis Severino in a spring training game. On May 16, 2016, Maybin was recalled by the Tigers following his rehab assignment with the Toledo Mud Hens. Maybin was named the American League Co-Player of the Week, along with fellow Tigers teammate Miguel Cabrera, for whom he had been traded 8 years ago, for the week of May 16–22. Maybin hit .600/.652/.750 with one home run, five RBIs and four stolen bases in his first six games in his second stint with the Tigers.

On June 30, 2016, Maybin was a key player in the Tigers' dramatic eight-run ninth inning against the Tampa Bay Rays. With the Tigers trailing 7–2 entering the top of the ninth, Maybin led off the inning with a single, and later finished the rally with a three-run double, helping the Tigers to a 10–7 win.

Maybin was placed on the 15-day disabled list August 4, 2016, having sprained his thumb diving for a ball in a game on August 3, 2016. He was activated on August 21, 2016, and started in center field against the Boston Red Sox.

Maybin hit .315 for the 2016 Tigers, with 4 home runs, 5 triples and a team-leading 15 stolen bases, but injuries limited him to just 92 games.

Los Angeles Angels (2017)

After the 2016 season, the Tigers traded Maybin to the Los Angeles Angels for Victor Alcántara. The Angels subsequently exercised the $9 million option on Maybin's contract for the 2017 season. On July 18, 2017, Maybin was placed on the disabled list with a MCL sprain in his right knee. Maybin batted .235, hit 6 home runs, stole 29 bases, and drove in 22 RBIs in 93 games with the Angels before being traded on August 31, 2017.

Houston Astros

On August 31, 2017, the Houston Astros acquired Maybin from the Angels off waivers.  In Game 2 of the 2017 World Series, Maybin came in as a pinch hitter; he singled and stole second in the 11th inning before scoring off a George Springer home run. Houston would go on to win that game 7–6 in the 11th. Houston would go on to win the series in 7, giving Maybin his first Championship. In 2017 for the Astros, he batted .186/.226/.441 in 59 at bats.

Second stint with the Marlins (2018)

On February 21, 2018, Maybin signed a one-year contract to return to the Marlins. With the Marlins in 2018 he batted .251/.338/.343 in 251 at bats.

Seattle Mariners
On July 31, 2018, Maybin was traded to the Seattle Mariners for shortstop Bryson Brigman and international pool money. With the Mariners in 2018 he batted .242/.289/.319 in 91 at bats.

San Francisco Giants
Maybin signed a minor league contract with a non-roster invitation to spring training with the San Francisco Giants on February 21, 2019. Maybin was arrested for DUI on March 1, 2019 and was released by the Giants on March 22, 2019.

Cleveland Indians

On March 29, 2019, Maybin signed a minor league deal with the Cleveland Indians. He began the 2019 season with the Columbus Clippers.

New York Yankees

On April 25, 2019, the Indians traded Maybin to the New York Yankees for cash considerations. The Yankees selected Maybin's contract after the trade and added him to the major league roster. Maybin made his debut with the Yankees the next day, April 26, in a game against the San Francisco Giants. He went 1–4 in the game with an RBI. Maybin homered in four consecutive games in June. The Yankees radio announcer, John Sterling gave the call of "Hammerin' Cameron!" after each of those and the rest of the home runs hit by Maybin, as he does for the rest of Yankee players (though with a unique call for each one). During his time with the Yankees, Maybin's consistent high-level play and enthusiastic personality made him a quick fan favorite.

Third stint with Detroit (2020) 

On February 12, 2020, the Tigers signed Maybin to a one-year $1.5 million contract for his third stint with the team and traded him a third time.

Chicago Cubs
On August 31, 2020, the Tigers traded Maybin to the Chicago Cubs in exchange for Zack Short. In 32 games split between the Tigers and Cubs, Maybin hit .247/.307/.387 with one home run and 7 RBI in 93 at-bats. On February 19, 2021, Maybin re-signed with the Cubs organization on a minor league contract that included an invitation to Spring Training.

On March 27, 2021, Maybin was granted his release by the Cubs, making him a free agent, but re-signed with the Cubs on a new minor league contract the next day.

New York Mets
On May 18, 2021, Maybin was traded to the New York Mets in exchange for cash considerations. The cash payment for the trade by the Mets was one dollar. On May 19, Maybin was selected to the active roster. Maybin was designated for assignment on May 31 after going 1-for-28 in 9 games. He was outrighted to the Triple-A Syracuse Mets on June 3. On October 4, Maybin elected free agency.

Maybin announced his retirement on January 3, 2022, in a tweet.

Broadcasting career
Maybin joined the YES Network as a color commentator for Yankees broadcasts for the 2022 season. In April 2022, he joined MLB Network as an on-air contributor for shows such as MLB Tonight. Maybin joined the Tigers broadcast team on Bally Sports Detroit as a studio analyst and occasional in-game analyst for the 2023 season.

Personal life
Maybin is a cousin of former NFL linebacker Aaron Maybin and current Houston Texans linebacker Jalen Reeves-Maybin (Reeves-Maybin's father is Marques Maybin, a former University of Louisville basketball guard), former NBA guard Rashad McCants, Former WNBA guard/forward Rashanda McCants and a third cousin of former NFL and Canadian Football League running back John Avery.

Maybin married his wife Courtney in 2015.

See also

List of Major League Baseball players suspended for performance-enhancing drugs

References

External links

 Minor League statistics at MiLB.com
 
 

1987 births
Living people
20th-century African-American people
21st-century African-American sportspeople
African-American baseball players
American sportspeople in doping cases
Atlanta Braves players
Baseball players from North Carolina
Carolina Mudcats players
Chicago Cubs players
Columbus Clippers players
Detroit Tigers announcers
Detroit Tigers players
El Paso Chihuahuas players
Erie SeaWolves players
Florida Marlins players
Gulf Coast Marlins players
Gulf Coast Tigers players
Houston Astros players
Lakeland Flying Tigers players
Los Angeles Angels players
Major League Baseball broadcasters
Major League Baseball center fielders
Major League Baseball players suspended for drug offenses
Miami Marlins players
MLB Network personalities
New Orleans Zephyrs players
New York Mets players
New York Yankees announcers
New York Yankees players
People from Atlanta
Peoria Saguaros players
San Diego Padres players
Seattle Mariners players
Syracuse Mets players
Sportspeople from Asheville, North Carolina
Tucson Padres players
West Michigan Whitecaps players